Congazcicul de Sus is a commune in the Gagauz Autonomous Territorial Unit of the Republic of Moldova. It is composed of three villages: Congazcicul de Jos, Congazcicul de Sus and Dudulești.

Population
 Total: 1480
 Gagauz: 1445
 Minorities: 363 Moldovans, 96 Bulgarians, 35 Russians, and 26 Ukrainians

References

Congazcicul de Sus